= María Luisa Canut =

Spanish physics researcher (born 1924)

Maria Luisa Canut Ruiz
- Born: 1924; Mahón, Menorca, Spain
- Died: 2025 (aged 100–101)
- Education: University of Barcelona
- Scientific career
- Fields: Physics
- Workplaces: Spanish National Research Council (CSIC); Southern Illinois University; National Science Foundation; Ministry of Education and Science (MEC)

Maria Luisa Canut Ruiz (1924 – August 2005) was a physics research recognized in both Spain and the United States.

== Biography ==
Born in Mahón in 1924, she earned both her bachelor's and doctoral degrees in Physics from the University of Barcelona. She served as a collaborator, investigator, and research professor at the Spanish National Research Council (CSIC), and held the position of full professor at the School of Engineering and Technology at Southern Illinois University (Illinois, USA), as well as Program Manager for the US-Spain & Latin America Cooperative Program at the National Science Foundation in Washington, D.C..

Upon returning to Spain, she served as Director of the Program for Administration, Educational, Cultural, and Research Cooperation between Spain and the United States—under the Technical General Secretariat of the Ministry of Education and Science (MEC)—and as Director of the Data Bank Office within the General Secretariat of the CSIC. She was also one of the founders of the Menorcan Institute of Studies (IME). Together with her husband, Dr. José Luis Amorós Portolés—also a doctor—she received the Francisco Franco Prize for Science in 1963 for their research work titled *La difracción difusa de los cristales moleculares (Diffuse Diffraction in Molecular Crystals), and the Research Recognition Award in 1968 from the Southern Illinois University Graduate Council.

As a professor, Canut participated in a legal challenge against American universities to secure the payment of salary differentials—the gap between the wages received by female university professors compared to their male colleagues—in violation of a law that had been passed years earlier. The female professors won the lawsuit, and the universities were compelled to pay the back wages covering the years elapsed since the law's enactment, while simultaneously equalizing their salaries going forward.

== Selected publications ==
- 1963 Studes on the cooperative phenomenon of X-Ray critical scattering near phase transitions in solids M. L. Canut
- 1975 The Laue Method José Luis Amoros, Martin J. Buerger, Marisa Canut de Amorós
- 1986 Sistema de informatización de una biblioteca (SINBIB) María Luisa Canut , Jose Luis Amoros
- 1991 Índice de la Revista de Menorca : 1888-1990 María Luisa Canut
- 1993 Europa 1700 : El grand tour del menorquín Bernardo José J.L. Amorós, Mª L. Canut, F. Martí Camps
- 1995 Lo que vio Bernardo José en su viaje por Flandes, Holanda y Sur de Inglaterra José Luis Amorós y María Luisa Canut
- 1999 Dones i èpoques : aproximació històrica al món de la dona a les Illes Balears coordinació d'Aina Pascual i Jaume Llabrés ; pròleg de Carme Riera ; textos de M. Lluïsa Canut, Jaume Llabrés, Mariantònia Manresa...[et al.] ; fotografies de Donald G. Murray
- 2000 Maestras y libros, 1850-1912 : la primera normal femenina de Baleares María Luisa Canut, José Luis Amorós
